Creophilus oculatus is a species of rove beetle endemic to New Zealand.

References

Staphylininae
Beetles of New Zealand
Taxa named by Johan Christian Fabricius
Beetles described in 1775